Hélton Soares Pereira (born November 13, 1974) best known as Hélton Soraes, or simple, Hélton is a Brazilian former football player who became a player agent and scout.

In Brazil, he played for Flamengo from 1992 to 1996, Avaí for 1997–98, and Barreira in 2004.   Overseas, he played for Arrayyan Sports Club for two seasons, and then Al-Wakrah Sports Club in Qatar.

He was signed to Pahang FA in Malaysia in 2003, and then played for Terengganu FA for a season and a half in 2005–2007. He then retired from playing and returned to Brazil.

Soares is the grandson of Brazilian soccer star "Didi," Valdir Pereira.

References

Living people
1974 births
People from Manaus
Sportspeople from Amazonas (Brazilian state)
Brazilian footballers
Association football midfielders
Avaí FC players
Terengganu FC players
Sri Pahang FC players
Brazilian expatriate footballers
Brazilian expatriate sportspeople in Qatar
Expatriate footballers in Qatar
Brazilian expatriate sportspeople in Malaysia
Expatriate footballers in Malaysia